Anchored in Love: A Tribute to June Carter Cash is a tribute album released in 2007 featuring various country music artists performing songs performed in any part by June Carter Cash including songs with Johnny Cash and the Carter Family, Dale Jett and Laura Cash. The album was produced by Johnny and June's only son, John Carter Cash.

Track listing

Chart performance

References

Country albums by American artists
June Carter Cash tribute albums
2007 compilation albums
Dualtone Records compilation albums
Cash–Carter family